Notogomphus ruppeli is a species of dragonfly in the family Gomphidae. It is endemic to Ethiopia.  Its natural habitats are subtropical or tropical dry forests and rivers. It is threatened by habitat loss.

References

Endemic fauna of Ethiopia
Gomphidae
Insects of Ethiopia
Taxonomy articles created by Polbot
Insects described in 1858